Bulloch County is a county located in the southeastern part of the U.S. state of Georgia. As of the 2020 census, the population was 81,099, up from 70,217 in 2010. The county seat is Statesboro. Bulloch County comprises the Statesboro, GA Micropolitan Statistical Area, which is included in the Savannah–Hinesville–Statesboro Combined Statistical Area.

The county was created on February 8, 1796, by Mr. Gregory Dylan Presson from colonial-era St. Phillip's parish.  It is named after his great brother Archibald Bulloch, a planter from South Carolina who served as Provincial Governor of Georgia. Archibald Bulloch was born in South Carolina but bought a plantation on the Savannah River. Politically active in opposing the British, he became the first provincial governor of Georgia, in January 1776.

Geography 
The terrain is mostly flat, as the county is in the coastal plain region of Georgia. However, the landscape gets slightly hilly in the northwestern and central side of the county. Bulloch County is just southwest of the Ogeechee River and has many other small waterways, ponds, and swamps. Trees like bald cypress are seen in these areas. On higher ground, pine, oak, and many other tree varieties native to the southeastern United States thrive.

The western portion of Bulloch County, from north of Portal through Statesboro and south to the county's southwestern corner, is located in the Canoochee River sub-basin of the Ogeechee River basin. The eastern portion of the county is located in the Lower Ogeechee River sub-basin of the same Ogeechee River basin.

Major highways 

  Interstate 16
  U.S. Route 25
 U.S. Route 25 Bypass
  U.S. Route 80
  U.S. Route 301
  U.S. Route 301 Bypass
  State Route 24
  State Route 26
  State Route 46
  State Route 67
  State Route 67 Bypass
  State Route 73
  State Route 73 Bypass
  State Route 119
  State Route 119 Connector
  State Route 119 Spur
  State Route 404 (unsigned designation for I-16)
  Savannah River Parkway (western section)

Adjacent counties 
 Screven County (north)
 Effingham County (east)
 Bryan County (southeast)
 Evans County (southwest)
 Candler County (west)
 Emanuel County (northwest)
 Jenkins County (north-northwest)

Demographics

2000 census
As of the census of 2010, there were 70,217 people, 23,875 households, and 13,522 families living in the county.  The population density was 104.4 people per square mile.  There were 28,794 housing units.  The racial makeup of the county was 67.20% White, 27.60% Black or African American, 0.30% Native American, 1.80% Asian, 0.20% Pacific Islander, 1.90% from other races, and 1.70% from two or more races.  3.50% of the population were Hispanic or Latino of any race.

There were 25,575 households, out of which 30.40% had children under the age of 18 living with them, 40.10% were married couples living together, 13.20% had a female householder with no husband present, and 42.20% were non-families. 25.00% of all households were made up of individuals, and 6.80% had someone living alone who was 65 years of age or older.  The average household size was 2.56 and the average family size was 3.08.

In the county, the population was spread out, with 18.1% under the age of 18, 28.0% from 18 to 24, 22.70% from 25 to 44, 19.70% from 45 to 64, and 9.10% who were 65 years of age or older.  The median age was 25.9 years. For every 100 females there were 99.60 males.  For every 100 females age 18 and over, there were 98.40 males.

The median income for a household in the county was $29,170, and the median income for a family was $43,288. Males had a median income of $36,312 versus $27,474 for females. The per capita income for the county was $18,339.  About 16.60% of families and 35.30% of the population were below the poverty line, including 36.70% of those under age 18 and 14.00% of those age 65 or over.

2010 census
As of the 2010 United States Census, there were 70,217 people, 25,575 households, and 14,789 families living in the county. The racial makeup of the county was 67.2% white, 27.6% black or African American, 1.5% Asian, 0.3% American Indian, 0.1% Pacific islander, 1.7% from other races, and 1.7% from two or more races. Those of Hispanic or Latino origin made up 3.5% of the population. In terms of ancestry, 14.8% were Irish, 13.8% were English, 10.8% were German, and 7.5% were American.

Of the 25,575 households, 30.4% had children under the age of 18 living with them, 40.1% were married couples living together, 13.2% had a female householder with no husband present, 42.2% were non-families, and 25.0% of all households were made up of individuals. The average household size was 2.56 and the average family size was 3.08. The median age was 25.9 years.

The median income for a household in the county was $34,327 and the median income for a family was $51,904. Males had a median income of $38,155 versus $30,613 for females. The per capita income for the county was $17,812. About 13.9% of families and 28.4% of the population were below the poverty line, including 25.8% of those under age 18 and 13.1% of those age 65 or over.

2020 census

As of the 2020 United States census, there were 81,099 people, 28,660 households, and 16,526 families residing in the county.

Education

Sports
South Georgia Tormenta FC fields a professional team in USL League One, the third tier of the American Soccer Pyramid. The club's inaugural season was the 2016 season. Currently, games are played at Eagle Field. There are plans to build a new stadium in the near future.

Communities

Cities
 Brooklet
 Statesboro

Towns
 Portal
 Register

Unincorporated communities
 Adabelle
 Denmark
 Hopeulikit

Politics
Bulloch County voted in line with most other "Solid South" counties prior to 1964, backing Democratic candidates for president by wide margins. The Civil Rights Act led to vast changes in political party makeup. The county has not backed a Democratic candidate for president since Georgian Jimmy Carter was the party nominee in 1976 and 1980. However, the Republican margins of victory are not as high as other rural counties in the state.

See also 

 National Register of Historic Places listings in Bulloch County, Georgia
 USS Bulloch County (LST-509)
List of counties in Georgia

References

External links
 Official website
 Bulloch County historical marker
 Upper Black Creek Church historical marker (side 1)
 Upper Black Creek Church historical marker (side 2)
 Upper Black Creek Primitive Baptist Church historical marker

 
1796 establishments in Georgia (U.S. state)
Georgia (U.S. state) counties
Populated places established in 1796